Streptococcus oralis is a Gram positive bacterium that grows characteristically in chains. It forms small white  colonies on a Wilkins-Chalgren agar plate. It is found in high numbers in the oral cavity. It has been classified as a member of the Streptococcus mitis group. Members of this group are opportunistic pathogens. Strains of S. oralis produce neuraminidase and an IgA protease and cannot bind α-amylase.

Natural genetic transformation

S. oralis is competent for natural genetic transformation.  Thus S. oralis cells are able to take up exogenous DNA and incorporate exogenous sequence information into their genomes by homologous recombination.  These bacteria can employ a predatory fratricidal mechanism for active acquisition of homologous DNA.

References

Note

External links
 Type strain of Streptococcus oralis at BacDive -  the Bacterial Diversity Metadatabase

Gram-positive bacteria
Streptococcaceae
Bacteria described in 1982